The Caroline Brevard Grammar School (also known as the Bloxham Building) is a historic school in Tallahassee, Florida. It is located at 727 South Calhoun Street and was designed by architect, William Augustus Edwards. On December 17, 1987, it was added to the U.S. National Register of Historic Places.

It is currently being used by the Leon County School District to house services of community-wide interest.  As of June 2016 the following offices were located in the Bloxham Building:  
 AmeriCorps Tallahassee
 Families in Transition
 Florida Diagnostic and Learning Resource System (FDLRS)
 Foundation for Leon County Schools
 Home Education
 Records Department 
 School Choice & Reassignment
 University Intern and Field Experience Office
 Virtual School, Leon County (LCVS)
 Whole Child Leon

References

External links

 Leon County listings at National Register of Historic Places
 Florida's Office of Cultural and Historical Programs
 Leon County listings
 Bloxham Building

Public elementary schools in Florida
History of Tallahassee, Florida
Historic buildings and structures in Leon County, Florida
National Register of Historic Places in Tallahassee, Florida
Schools in Tallahassee, Florida
William Augustus Edwards buildings